The Rape of Orithyia by Boreas is a 1620 painting by Peter Paul Rubens, now in the Academy of Fine Arts Vienna. It shows the rape of Orithyia by Boreas.

External links
Catalogue page

Mythological paintings by Peter Paul Rubens
1620 paintings
Paintings depicting Greek myths
Paintings in the collection of the Academy of Fine Arts Vienna